Gibbula guttadauri is a species of sea snail, a marine gastropod mollusk in the family Trochidae, the top snails.

Description
The size of the shell varies between 4 mm and 11 mm. The small, umbilicate shell has a conical shape. It is whitish, irregularly maculated with reddish brown or purplish above, dotted beneath. The six whorls are turreted and very convex. The apex is acute. The body whorl is encircled by three strong ribs, one on the periphery, the others above it. The interstices are lamellose-striate. They are plicate or lamellose-striate below the sutures. The base of the shell contains 6 or 7 concentric lirae. The columella is nearly straight, arcuate above and terminates in a tubercle below. The umbilicus is narrow.

Distribution
This species occurs in the Mediterranean Sea (Sicily) and in the Adriatic Sea (Dalmatian coast)

References

 Philippi R. A., 1836: Enumeratio molluscorum Siciliae cum viventium tum in tellure tertiaria fossilium, quae in itinere suo observavit. Vol. 1; Schropp, Berlin (Berolini) xiv + 267 p., pl. 1–12 
 Gofas, S.; Le Renard, J.; Bouchet, P. (2001). Mollusca, in: Costello, M.J. et al. (Ed.) (2001). European register of marine species: a check-list of the marine species in Europe and a bibliography of guides to their identification. Collection Patrimoines Naturels, 50: pp. 180–213

External links
 

guttadauri
Gastropods described in 1836